The 1937–38 Rugby Football League season was the 43rd season of rugby league football.

Season summary

Hunslet won their second, and to date last, Championship when they defeated Leeds 8-2 in the play-off final. They had also finished the regular season as the league leaders. The final was due to have taken place at Belle Vue, Wakefield, but as both clubs were from Leeds, the Rugby Football League switched the match to Elland Road in Leeds, with the final being played on 30 April 1938 in front of a crowd of 54,112.

The Challenge Cup Winners were Salford who beat Barrow 7-4 in the final.

Warrington won the Lancashire League, and Leeds won the Yorkshire League. Warrington beat Barrow 8–4 to win the Lancashire County Cup, and Leeds beat Huddersfield 14–8 to win the Yorkshire County Cup.

Championship

Championship play-off

Challenge Cup

Salford beat Barrow 7-4 in the final played at Wembley on Saturday 7 May 1938 in front of a crowd of 51,243.  This was the lowest winning score in a Wembley final, only equalled in 1970.

This was Salford’s first Challenge Cup Final win in their fourth Final appearance.

This was Barrow’s first appearance in the Final.

References

Sources
1937-38 Rugby Football League season at wigan.rlfans.com
The Challenge Cup at The Rugby Football League website

1937 in English rugby league
1938 in English rugby league
Northern Rugby Football League seasons